Bala Moallem Kola (also Romanized as Bālā Mo‘allem Kolā) is a village in Miandorud-e Kuchak Rural District, in the Central District of Sari County, Mazandaran Province, Iran. At the 2006 census, its population was 569, in 147 families.

References 

Populated places in Sari County